Muhaini binti Zainal Abidin (Jawi: مهيني بنت زين العابدين; born 12 November 1961) is a Malaysian who is the wife of Ismail Sabri Yaakob, the 9th Prime Minister of Malaysia from August 2021 to November 2022 and 13th Deputy Prime Minister of Malaysia from July 2021 to August 2021.

Personal life 
In 1979, Muhaini became friends with Ismail Sabri Yaakob, who was 19 at the time. She married him in 1986. They had four children – three sons and one daughter.

One of her sons, Dafi (born Gadaffi bin Ismail Sabri), was a participant in the fifth season of reality program Akademi Fantasia in 2007. Her only daughter, Nina Sabrina, has married a fashion designer named Jovian Mandagie.

Honours 
  :
  Grand Knight of the Order of Sultan Ahmad Shah of Pahang (SSAP) – Dato' Sri (2015)

References 

1961 births
Living people
Spouses of prime ministers of Malaysia
Malaysian people of Malay descent
Malaysian Muslims
Spouses of Deputy Prime Ministers of Malaysia